Douglas Ryan Edert (born March 5, 2000) is an American college basketball player for the Bryant Bulldogs of the America East conference. He previously played for the Saint Peter's Peacocks. Edert is best known for his integral role in Saint Peter's historic underdog run to the Elite Eight in the 2022 NCAA Division I men's basketball tournament.

During the 2022 NCAA Division I men's basketball tournament, Edert initially gained popularity for his mustache and his performances when the Peacocks upset second-seeded Kentucky in the Round of 64, and then the seventh-seeded Murray State in the Round of 32. In the regional semifinals, the team beat third-seeded Purdue to become the first 15th-seeded team to advance to the Elite 8. During this run, he became a phenomenon within the basketball community and was given nicknames such as Dougie Buckets and Dirty Doug, the latter of which also become the name of a Barstool Sports clothing line.

High school career
Edert played prep basketball at Bergen Catholic High School. In his senior year, Edert helped propel the team to a Non-Public A State title in the NJSIAA boys' basketball playoffs. In the same year, he led the team to win the 63rd Bergen Jamboree against Don Bosco Preparatory High School, their first win against the school in five years during the Bergen Jamboree. On September 26, 2018, Edert committed to playing college basketball for Saint Peter's.

College career

Saint Peter's
During the 2022 NCAA Division I men's basketball tournament, he gained popularity after his performances during games against Kentucky and Murray State. Edert also gained popularity for a mustache that he had left when fellow teammate Matthew Lee lost a mustache after cutting most of his facial hair. According to Edert, the mustache was supposed to be temporary, but since his success at the tournament, he was planning on keeping it, saying "Maybe the mustache is giving me powers." On April 5, 2022, Edert entered the transfer portal following three seasons at Saint Peter's.

Bryant
On April 9, 2022, Edert announced his commitment to Bryant.

Career statistics

College

|-
| style="text-align:left;"| 2019–20
| style="text-align:left;"| Saint Peter's
| 30 || 7 || 17.3 || .440 || .442 || .767 || 1.8 || .6 || .2 || .1 || 7.8
|-
| style="text-align:left;"| 2020–21
| style="text-align:left;"| Saint Peter's
| 23 || 9 || 24.3 || .335 || .318 || .848 || 3.3 || .7 || .8 || .2 || 7.7
|-
| style="text-align:left;"| 2021–22
| style="text-align:left;"| Saint Peter's
| 33 || 7 || 23.9 || .453 || .411 || .887 || 2.5 || .9 || .5 || .1 || 9.5
|- class="sortbottom"
| style="text-align:center;" colspan="2"| Career
| 86 || 23 || 21.7 || .414 || .392 || .849 || 2.5 || .7 || .5 || .1 || 8.4

Personal life
Edert is the son of Allison and William Edert. He has a brother, Nick, who is an officer in the Newark Police Department. Edert is currently in a relationship with girlfriend Olyvia Smith.

On March 23, 2022, Edert signed a NIL deal with restaurant chain Buffalo Wild Wings.

Footnotes

References

External links
Saint Peter's Peacocks bio

2000 births
Living people
American men's basketball players
Basketball players from New Jersey
Bergen Catholic High School alumni
Bryant Bulldogs men's basketball players
People from Nutley, New Jersey
Point guards
Saint Peter's Peacocks men's basketball players
Sportspeople from Essex County, New Jersey